Linna RC is a Finnish rugby club in Hämeenlinna.

External links
Linna RC

Rugby clubs established in 2011
Finnish rugby union teams
Sport in Hämeenlinna
2011 establishments in Finland